Mongolia competed at the 1988 Summer Olympics in Seoul, South Korea.

Competitors
The following is the list of number of competitors in the Games.

Medalists

Archery

Women

Boxing

Judo

Men

References

Official Olympic Reports
International Olympic Committee results database

Nations at the 1988 Summer Olympics
1988
Oly